Leslie A. Perlow is an American ethnographer currently the Konosuke Matsushita Professor of Leadership at Harvard Business School.

References

Year of birth missing (living people)
Living people
Harvard Business School faculty
American women economists
21st-century American women